Callahan may refer to:

Callahan (surname)

Fictional characters 
Father Callahan, in Stephen King novels
Harry Callahan (character), in Dirty Harry movies
Jack Callahan (Neighbours), from the Australian soap opera Neighbours
Mike Callahan, of Callahan's Crosstime Saloon in the novel series 
Nancy Callahan, from the Sin City graphic novel series
Peggy Callahan in the TV series The Bionic Woman
Professor Callahan, in the movie Legally Blonde
Thomas R. "Tommy" Callahan III in film Tommy Boy
Veronica Callahan in Mercy (TV series)
Bob Callahan from the movie Tag
Robert Callaghan in Big Hero 6 (film)
Officer Callahan from the serie Stranger Things.
Iain Callahan, A former Archon of Caoiva from Foxhole (video game)

Places

United States
Callahan, California, an unincorporated community
Callahan, Florida, a town in Nassau County
Callahan County, Texas
Callahan State Park, Massachusetts
Callahan Creek, a stream in Missouri
Callahan Tunnel, Massachusetts

Other
A move in Ultimate Frisbee named after Henry Callahan

See also
Callaghan (disambiguation)
Callihan